Crenicichla sveni is a species of cichlid native to South America. It is found in the Orinoco River basin, in the Llanos of Venezuela and Colombia..

The fish is named in honor of “Swedish cichlidologist” Sven O. Kullander (b. 1952) of the Swedish Museum of Natural History, because of his contributions to the further knowledge of the genus Crenicichla.

References

sveni
Freshwater fish of Colombia
Fish of Venezuela
Taxa named by Alex Ploeg
Fish described in 1991